According to the Moldovan law on territorial administrative organisation, two or more villages can form together a commune.

Below is the list of communes of Moldova, grouped by the first-tier administrative unit to which they belong, and including the number and the list of villages of which they are comprised, plus the population values as of 2004 and 2014 Moldovan Censuses. In communes under Transnistrian control, censuses were not held.

Current communes

Former communes

Notes
 The notation (loc. st. c. f.) denotes a locality-railway station (Romanian: localitate-stație de cale ferată), as is officially designed by the authorities.

See also

 Administrative divisions of Moldova

References

Bibliography

Results of Population and Housing Census in the Republic of Moldova in 2014: 

Populated places in Moldova
Subdivisions of Moldova
Lists of subdivisions of Moldova